Caroline Gallup Reed (also known as Mrs. Sylvanus Reed; 5 August 1821 in Berne, New York – 17 November 1914 in New York City) was a United States educator.

Biography
She was the daughter of Albert Gallup, treasurer of Albany County, New York, and was educated at St. Peter's School and the female academy in Albany. In 1851 she married Sylvanus Reed, and in 1864 established a school for young women in New York City. In 1883, the school was incorporated under the laws of New York State as Reed College, so as to assure the perpetuity of the establishment.

Reed was elected a member of the American Geographical Society in 1860, of the American Association for the Advancement of Science, and of the New York Genealogical and Biographical Society in 1882.

She published various papers, and, before retiring, regularly issued "circulars of information" upon subjects of general educational interest. Her son Sylvanus Albert Reed became an engineer, winning the 1925 Collier Trophy for the invention of the practical aircraft propeller.

References
 
 
Attribution
 

1821 births
1914 deaths
Heads of universities and colleges in the United States
Educators from New York City
American women educators
Women heads of universities and colleges